for other places called Padornelo, see Padornelo
Padornelo is a Spanish parish located in the municipality of Lubián in the region of Sanabria, Castile and León. It is located at a height of 1260 meters.

References

Bibliography
 Cabeza Quiles, Fernando (1992) Os nomes de lugar. Topónimos de Galicia: a súa orixe e o seu significado, Edicións Xerais de Galicia, Vigo; p. 326
 Moralejo Lasso, A. (1977) Toponimia gallega y leonesa, Santiago de Compostela, p. 321, note 13

External links
 Lubián
 Cultura de Lubián
 “Medio natural y poblamiento en la toponimia mayor de Zamora”, Anuario 2000, Instituto de Estudios Zamoranos "Florián de Ocampo", Diputación de Zamora, p. 449-500
 Santuario de La Tuiza

Castile and León
Populated places in the Province of Zamora